Janey Makes a Play is a 2015 American documentary film about playwright/director Janey Callahan-Chin, then 90 years old, and the making of her 18th musical theater production. The documentary was directed by Callahan-Chin's grandson Jared Callahan and distributed by Uncork'd Entertainment. The film premiered at the 2015 Atlanta Film Festival and released digitally on June 28, 2016.

References

External links
 

2015 films
2015 documentary films
2010s English-language films
American documentary films
Documentary films about playwrights
Documentary films about women writers
Films produced by Brent Ryan Green
Films scored by Joel P. West
2010s American films